A come and sing event is a temporary choir ("scratch choir") that rehearses and/or performs choral music, often within a single day.

These events typically involve people who would otherwise be unable to commit to regular membership of a choir, or who wish to try choral singing for the first time. Usually the music is familiar mainstream classic works e.g. Handel's Messiah, Fauré's Requiem, Verdi's Requiem, though the programme may be chosen to coincide with a festival or other special occasion or time of year or day (e.g. Evensong, Nine Lessons and Carols).

See also
Sing-along

Choirs
Singing